Abu Ma'shar Najih al-Sindi al-Madani (full name:), d. 787, was a Muslim historian and hadith scholar. Al-Tabari quoted him for Biblical information and chronological statements about the Islamic prophet Muhammad and later Muslim conquests. As a hadith transmitter, Muslim experts in biographical evaluation generally considered him unreliable.

Life 

Of Sindhi ancestry, Abu Ma'shar was a freed slave from Yemen who lived in Medina. In 160 AH / 776 CE he left Medina and settled in Baghdad, where he was close to members of the Abbasid court until his death in 170 AH / 787 CE.

References 

787 deaths
8th-century historians from the Abbasid Caliphate
Hadith scholars
Writers of lost works
8th-century Arabic writers
People from Medina
Sindhi people
Sindhi scholars
Arab people of Sindhi descent